Henry E. Dooms (January 30, 1867 – December 14, 1899), nicknamed "Jack", was a Major League Baseball outfielder.

Sources

1867 births
1899 deaths
Major League Baseball outfielders
Baseball players from Missouri
Louisville Colonels players
19th-century baseball players
Leavenworth Soldiers players
Lincoln Tree Planters players
Kansas City Cowboys (minor league) players
Newark Trunkmakers players
Newark Little Giants players
Lincoln Rustlers players
Des Moines Prohibitionists players